Bulnesia carrapo is a species of plant in the family Zygophyllaceae. It is endemic to Colombia.

References

carrapo
Endemic flora of Colombia
Endangered flora of South America
Taxonomy articles created by Polbot
Taxobox binomials not recognized by IUCN